Taylor Corners is a census-designated place (CDP) in the town of New Fairfield, Fairfield County, Connecticut, United States. It is in the southwest corner of the town, bordered to the south by the city of Danbury, to the north by Ball Pond, and to the west by the town of Southeast in Putnam County, New York.

Taylor Corners was first listed as a CDP prior to the 2020 census.

References 

Census-designated places in Fairfield County, Connecticut
Census-designated places in Connecticut